Old Manor Farm is a 15th-century hall in Marple, in the Metropolitan Borough of Stockport, Greater Manchester, England. Built in the 15th century, it has had additions made in the 16th, 17th and 20th centuries. Called "one of the finest existing examples of a small medieval manor house in Lancashire or Cheshire", it is a Grade II* listed building.

Marple has five nationally important buildings, listed by English Heritage as either Grade I or Grade II. One of these is Old Manor Farm, tucked away above the Marple Brook which runs in the valley near Dan Bank. Described by Pevsner as 'a small medieval manor house, the central part timber-framed, probably 15th century, with a two-bay hall of cruck construction. Later wings were added, the service wing of stone, the other half-timber.' Its importance was recognised in 1951 when it was featured in Cheshire Life magazine as one of the “Homes of Cheshire”.

See also

Grade II* listed buildings in Greater Manchester
Listed buildings in Marple, Greater Manchester

References

Houses in Greater Manchester
Grade II* listed buildings in Greater Manchester
Buildings and structures in the Metropolitan Borough of Stockport
Grade II* listed houses
Marple, Greater Manchester